The 1977 Paris Open, also known as the Jean Becker Open,  was a men's tennis tournament played on indoor carpet courts that was part of the 1977 Grand Prix circuit. It was the 8th edition of the Paris Open (later known as the Paris Masters). It took place at the Palais omnisports de Paris-Bercy in Paris, France from 31 October 1977 through 6 November 1977. Corrado Barazzutti won the singles title.

Finals

Singles

 Corrado Barazzutti defeated  Brian Gottfried 7–6, 7–6, 6–7, 3–6, 6–4
 It was Barazzutti's 3rd title of the year and the 4th of his career.

Doubles

 Brian Gottfried /  Raúl Ramírez defeated  Jeff Borowiak /  Roger Taylor 6–2, 6–0
 It was Gottfried's 10th title of the year and the 48th of his career. It was Ramirez's 8th title of the year and the 55th of his career.

References

External links 
 ATP tournament profile